Chloe Rebecca Smith (born 17 May 1982) is a British politician who served as Secretary of State for Work and Pensions from September to October 2022. She previously served as Minister of State for Disabled People, Work and Health from 2021 to 2022. A member of the Conservative Party, she has been Member of Parliament (MP) for Norwich North since 2009.

Smith was elected in a 2009 by-election following the resignation of Labour MP Ian Gibson after the MPs' expenses scandal. Smith held a number of junior ministerial roles under David Cameron and Theresa May, serving two terms as Parliamentary Secretary for the Constitution. She continued to serve in the latter role after Boris Johnson's victory in the 2019 Conservative Party leadership election. In the February 2020 reshuffle, she was promoted to Minister of State during the second Johnson ministry. In the 2021 reshuffle, she was appointed by Johnson as Minister of State at the Department for Work and Pensions. After Johnson resigned in 2022, Smith supported Liz Truss’s bid to become Conservative leader. Following Truss's appointment as Prime Minister, she appointed Smith as Secretary of State for Work and Pensions.

Early life
Smith was born in Ashford, Kent, in 1982. Her family moved to Stoke Ferry, Norfolk, when she was three years old, and she attended comprehensive schools in Swaffham and Methwold. After a gap year working for former Conservative Education Secretary Gillian Shephard, she read English Literature at the University of York. She undertook summer work for Bernard Jenkin.

After graduating from York University, she joined Deloitte Touche Tohmatsu as a management consultant. She advised private businesses, government departments and public bodies.

In 2007, Smith was chosen to be the Conservative Party candidate for the constituency of Norwich North at the general election. She then took leave from her job, working for Conservative Central Office on secondment, to "draw up detailed plans to put our policies into practice".

Parliamentary career
Following resignation of Labour MP Ian Gibson after the MPs' expenses scandal, Smith became the Conservatives' by-election candidate and subsequently gained the seat, becoming youngest member of the House of Commons. She took her seat in the House of Commons when the parliamentary break ended in October.

On 14 October 2011, she was appointed Economic Secretary to the Treasury in a ministerial reshuffle, becoming the youngest minister serving in government at that point. According to The Guardian newspaper Smith was appointed to the role because David Cameron wrongly understood her to be a trained accountant.

On 26 June 2012, she appeared on the BBC Two current affairs programme Newsnight and was interviewed about Chancellor George Osborne's decision that day to delay plans to increase fuel duty. Jeremy Paxman questioned the apparent change in her views on fuel duty. The interview attracted much comment, being described as a "mauling" and a "humiliation" of Smith. Politicians, including John Prescott and Nadine Dorries, questioned Osborne's judgement for sending a junior minister onto the programme in his place.

In September 2012, Smith was appointed Parliamentary Under-Secretary of State at the Cabinet Office.

In August 2013, she was criticised for blocking identification of civil servants and public sector bodies responsible for £77m of flights booked through the Government Procurement Service. In October 2013, she resigned from the Cabinet Office to "concentrate on the most important part of my job: being the Member of Parliament for Norwich North".

In May 2014, she was awarded the Grassroot Diplomat Initiative Award under the Business Driver category for designing and conceiving the Norwich for Jobs campaign, which brought over 400 jobs and apprenticeships for young people in her constituency.

During the campaign for the 2015 general election, Smith was mocked by political opponents for quoting a constituent's letter in her election literature. The letter said she seemed "to act more like a Socialist than a Conservative". Smith responded: "Clearly I am not a socialist. I am a proud Conservative. What the letter writer was saying was my work can appeal across party lines".

She retained her Norwich North seat in the snap 2017 general election, taking 21,900 votes, ahead of Labour's Chris Jones by 507 votes. Following the election, she was appointed as Parliamentary Under Secretary of State for Northern Ireland working under James Brokenshire.

In January 2018, during the 2018 British cabinet reshuffle by Theresa May, Smith was appointed Parliamentary Secretary for the Constitution, a role she had previously held under David Cameron. In February 2020, Smith was promoted to Minister of State by Boris Johnson.

In August 2019, Smith was the victim of an anthrax scare in which she was sent a package of white powder.

In September 2021, during the cabinet reshuffle, Smith became Minister of State for Disabled People, Work and Health at the Department for Work and Pensions.

On 6 September 2022, the then-Prime Minister Liz Truss appointed Smith as Secretary of State for Work and Pensions.  She was sworn-in as a member of the Privy Council on 13 September 2022 at Buckingham Palace following her appointment. entitling her to the honorific prefix "The Right Honourable" for Life.

On 25 October 2022, following the appointment of Rishi Sunak as Prime Minister, Smith returned to the backbenches.

On 22 November 2022 Smith announced that she would not stand for election to Parliament at the next general election.

Political positions 
Smith's political stances have included support for lower taxation, increasing VAT, and opposition to the Lisbon Treaty. She also supported the legalisation of same-sex marriage. She singles out Benjamin Disraeli as a political leader she admires.

Smith was opposed to Brexit before the 2016 referendum. She endorsed Boris Johnson during the 2019 Conservative Party leadership election.

Personal life
Smith is an active volunteer and fundraiser for several charities including Cancer Research UK and Sport Relief. She is an atheist.

In 2013, Smith married financial consultant Sandy McFadzean. They had their first child, a son, in 2016. In 2019, their second child, a daughter, was born.

In November 2020, Smith announced that she had been diagnosed with breast cancer. In June 2021, she announced that after chemotherapy and surgery, she was cancer-free.

Notes

References

External links
 
 Chloe Smith MP Conservative Party

 Flickr page
 Chloe Smith, Grassroot Diplomat
 

|-

|-

1982 births
Living people
21st-century English politicians
21st-century English women politicians
Alumni of the University of York
English atheists
Conservative Party (UK) MPs for English constituencies
Economic Secretaries to the Treasury
Female members of the Cabinet of the United Kingdom
Female members of the Parliament of the United Kingdom for English constituencies
Members of the Privy Council of the United Kingdom
Northern Ireland Office junior ministers
People from Ashford, Kent
People from Stoke Ferry
Secretaries of State for Work and Pensions
UK MPs 2005–2010
UK MPs 2010–2015
UK MPs 2015–2017
UK MPs 2017–2019
UK MPs 2019–present